Juan Sebastián de Elcano is a training ship of the Spanish Navy. It is a four-masted topsail, steel-hulled barquentine (schooner barque).

It is named after Spanish explorer Juan Sebastián Elcano, captain of Ferdinand Magellan's last exploratory fleet and the man who completed the first circumnavigation of the world. The ship carries the Elcano coat of arms, which was granted to the family by Emperor Charles I following Elcano's return in 1522 from Magellan's global expedition. The coat of arms is a globe with the motto "Primus Circumdedisti Me" (meaning: "First to circumnavigate me").

Build and design
Juan Sebastián de Elcano was built in 1927 in Cadiz, Spain, and its hull was designed by the naval architect Mr C E Nicholson of Camper and Nicholsons Ltd of Southampton. Constructed by Echevarrieta y Larrinaga shipyard in Cadiz. After the proclamation of the Second Spanish Republic in April 1931 the ship became part of the Spanish Republican Navy.

In 1933 under Commander Salvador Moreno Fernández's order, a series of improvements were made to the ship and the bronze plate with the Latin language inscription Tu Primus Circumdedisti Me was placed near the prow. At the time of the coup of July 1936 Juan Sebastián de Elcano was in Ferrol, a harbor that had been taken by the Nationalist faction.  
Its plans were used twenty-five years later to construct its Chilean sail training vessel sister ship Esmeralda in 1952–1954.

Maiden voyage 
It conducted sea trials between April and July that year from Cádiz to Málaga, with King Alfonso XIII on board as a passenger, and then on to Sevilla, Las Palmas, Tenerife, San Sebastián, Cádiz, São Vicente, Cape Verde, Montevideo, Buenos Aires, Cape Town, Adelaide, Melbourne, Sydney, Suva, San Francisco, California, Balboa, Panama, Havana, New York City, Cádiz.

Naval Commanders of Juan Sebastián Elcano
Commanders that have been in charge of Juan Sebastián Elcano for crossings and instruction.

 Manuel de Mendivil y Elio. 29 September 1927
 Claudio Lago de Lanzos y Díaz. 4 June 1929
 Joaquín López Cortijo. 5 June 1931
 Salvador Moreno Fernández. 7 June 1933
 Cristóbal González-Aller y Acebal. 24 June 1935
 Fernando Meléndez Bojart. 15 December 
 Pedro Sans Torres. 20 December 1940
 Camilo Carrero Blanco. 17 January 1942
 Antonio Blanco García. 24 November 1942
 Leopoldo Boado Endeiza. 27 June 1944
 Manuel de la Puente y Magallanes. 18 July 1946
 Álvaro de Urzáiz y de Silva. 15 July 1948
 Luis Cebreiro Blanco. 3 August 1950
 Gonzalo Díaz García. 15 July 1952
 José Yusty Pita. 19 August 1953
 José Ramón González López. 20 July 1955
 Miguel Domingo Sotelo. 27 August 1958
 José Díaz Cuñado. 26 September 1960
 Teodoro de Leste y Cisneros. 22 December 1961
 Francisco Javier de Elizalde y Laínez. 6 August 1963
 Salvador Vázquez Durán. 18 November 1964
 Francisco Gil de Sola Caballero. 17 August 1966
 Álvaro Fontanals Baron. 20 September 1968
 Agustín Rosety Caro. 1 August 1970
 Ricardo Vallespín Raurell. 28 September 1971
 Marcial Fournier Palicio. 1 September 1973
 Antonio Nalda y Díaz de Tuesta. 26 September 1975
 Ángel Luis Díaz del Río y Martínez. 3 October 1977
 Ignacio Cela Diz. 3 de October 1979

 Cristóbal Colón de Carvajal y Maroto. 7 January 1981
 Rafael Ceñal Fernández. 30 October 1982
 Manuel de la Puente y Sicre. 19 August 1983
 Antonio Diufain de Alba. 23 August 1984
 Rafael Martí Narbona. 15 November 1985
 Gabriel Portal Antón. 10 July 1987
 José Alejandro Artal Delgado. 25 November 1988
 Pedro Lapique Quiñones. 3 October 1989
 Rafael Vallejo Ruiz. 4 October 1991
 Ángel Tajuelo Pardo de Andrade. 1 October 1992
 Juan José González-Irún Sánchez. 8 October 1993
 Antonio González-Aller Suevos. 4 October 1994
 Manuel Calvo Freijomil. 15 September 1995
 Sebastián Zaragoza Soto. 18 September 1996
 Teodoro de Leste Contreras. 2 October 1997
 Constantino Lobo Franco. 11 September 1998
 Juan C. Muñoz-Delgado Díaz del Río. 8 October 1999
 Jaime Rodríguez-Toubes Núñez. 6 October 2000
 Manuel Rebollo García. 5 October 2001
 Santiago Bolívar Piñeiro. 4 October 2002
 Juan F. Martínez Núñez. 3 October 2003
 Luis Cayetano y Garrido. 29 September 2004
 Salvador M. Delgado Moreno. 29 September 2005
 Javier Romero Caramelo. 21 September 2007
 Manuel de la Puente Mora-Figueroa. 25 September 2009
 Alfonso Carlos Gómez Fernández de Córdoba. 23 September 2011
 Enrique Torres Piñeyro. September 2013

See also
 Fernando Villaamil, and his circumnavigation in 1892-1894 commanding the Nautilus training ship.
 Ferrol
 Spanish Naval Academy In modern times, Institution where the Spanish Armada (i.e.: Spanish Navy) officers and other personnel receive their education.
 El Galatea (also known as Glenlee) From 1922 till 1969 she was the Training Tall Ship for the Spanish Navy in Ferrol (North-western Spain).
 El Club Naval de Ferrol Originally designed for the amusement of the Spanish Navy personnel and their families posted to the Naval Station of Ferrol.
 Structure of the Spanish Navy in the 21st century
 List of large sailing vessels
 List of schooners

References

Tall ships of Spain
Ships of the Spanish Navy
Four-masted ships
Schooners
Sail training ships
Ships built in Spain
1927 ships